Superliga de Voleibol Masculina 2011–12 was the 48th (XLVIII) season since its establishment. The 2011–12 season started in October 2011, and finished on April 14, 2012.

Defending champions, Caja3 Teruel were able to defend its previous season title and won its second title in a row.

Competition format
9 teams played in a two-round format. Upon completion of regular season, the top four teams play Championship's playoffs, while the bottom team is relegated to Superliga 2.

During regular season, a win by 3–0 or 3–1 means 3 points to winner team, while a 3–2 win, 2 points for winner team & 1 for loser team.

Championship playoffs is played to best of 3 games.

2011–12 season teams

2011–12 season standings

Championship playoffs

Bracket
To best of three games.

Semifinals

Match 1

|}

Match 2

|}

Match 3

|}

Match 4

|}

Match 5

|}

Final

Match 1

|}

Match 2

|}

Match 3

|}

Top scorers
(This statistics includes regular season and playoff matches.)

References

External links
Superliga Masculina official website

2011 in volleyball
2012 in volleyball
Superliga de Voleibol Masculina
2011 in Spanish sport
2012 in Spanish sport